Maya Tea Company is a beverage company, based in Tucson, Arizona, that specializes in the production of custom tea blends, chai concentrates and southwestern spices.

History
The company was first established in 1997 by founder and owner, Manish Shah, and his brother, cofounder Yash Shah. The name, "Maya", comes from the first two letters of the brothers' first names. The brothers started first by importing teas from China and India.  The first sales outlet was a booth at the local farmers' market.

As the business expanded, operations were moved into a large warehouse on the west side of Tucson.

In 2014 a trademark "Maya Tea" was issued by the US Government.  At that time Maya Tea Company teas were served in various coffeeshops, teahouses, restaurants, taverns, salons and hotels across the United States.  The company also produces and distributes packaged leaves for home use.

Maya's teas can be found in many collaborative products, including Dogfish Head Brewery's Sah'tea beer, Terrapin Beer Company's Samurai Krunkle's ale, and Borderland Brewing Company's Hibiscus Saison and Agua Bendita Wheat Wine beers. The company has been featured in Fresh Cup Magazine's "2013 Tea Almanac", Tea Magazine,  Tucson Lifestyle Home & Garden, and on the podcast, Steeping Around.

References

Companies based in Arizona
Food and drink companies established in 1997
Tea companies of the United States
American companies established in 1997
1997 establishments in Arizona